Haunt are an American heavy metal band from Fresno, California. The band was originally created as a solo project by Trevor William Church. As such, he is technically the only original member in the lineup. Church is also the sole songwriter and lyricist in the group.

History 
Haunt was originally formed by Trevor William Church as a musical project to be worked on alongside his existing band Beastmaker; the project was to take on a traditional metal sound as opposed to Beastmaker's doom metal style. In 2017 Church wrote and recorded Haunt's debut release, the extended play Luminous Eyes, with Daniel Wilson playing drums for the recording. It was first released digitally, as an independent release, but it later received physical releases from the Shadow Kingdom Records label.

In 2018, Church wrote and recorded one single for Haunt, Ghosts. Later that same year, Haunt released their first full-length studio album, Burst into Flame. Daniel Wilson returned to play drums for the album, this time as an official band member. Joining Church and Wilson for the album were Matthew Wilhoit on bass and John Tucker on guitar. Both Wilson and Tucker would stay as permanent members, but Wilhoit would be replaced by Taylor Hollman on following releases.

In 2019, Haunt released their second EP, (Mosaic Vision) their second studio album, (If Icarus Could Fly) and two split albums. (A Fool's Paradise / On the Streets Again and Sea of Dreams / The Crystal Temple). The following year they released their third and fourth studio albums, titled Mind Freeze and Flashback respectively, as well as the Burst into Demos compilation.

Members

Current members 

 Trevor William Church – vocals, guitar, bass, drums (2017–present)
 Andy Lei - guitar (live) (2021-present)
 Andy Saldate - drums (live) (2021-present)

Past members 

 Matthew Wilhoit – bass (2018)
 John Tucker - lead-guitar (2018-2021)
 Daniel „Wolfie“ Wilson - drums (2017-2021)
 Taylor Hollman - bass (2018-2021)

Discography

Studio albums

Extended plays

Singles

Split albums

Compilations

References

Musical groups established in 2017
Heavy metal musical groups from California
2017 establishments in California